The 2015 South American Under-20 Women's Football Championship was the seventh edition of the South American Under-20 Women's Football Championship, the biennial international youth football championship organised by the CONMEBOL for the women's under-20 national teams of South America. The tournament was held in Santos, Brazil between 18 November and 3 December 2015.

Same as previous editions, the tournament acted as the CONMEBOL qualifiers for the FIFA U-20 Women's World Cup. The top two teams of the tournament qualified for the 2016 FIFA U-20 Women's World Cup in Papua New Guinea as the CONMEBOL representatives.

Brazil were crowned champions and maintained their streak of winning all seven editions so far, and qualified for the World Cup together with runners-up Venezuela, who qualified for the first time.

Teams
All ten CONMEBOL member national teams entered the tournament.

Venues
The tournament was played in Santos. The stadiums were Santos's Estádio Urbano Caldeira (Vila Belmiro) and Portuguesa Santista's Estádio Ulrico Mursa (Marapé).

Squads
Players born on or after 1 January 1996 were eligible to compete in the tournament. Each team could register a maximum of 22 players (three of whom must be goalkeepers).

First stage
The draw of the tournament was held on 16 October 2015 during the CONMEBOL Executive Committee meeting at the Hyatt Hotel in Santiago, Chile. The ten teams were drawn into two groups of five teams. Each group contained one team from each of the five "pairing pots": Argentina–Brazil, Colombia–Paraguay, Peru–Uruguay, Chile–Ecuador, Bolivia–Venezuela. The schedule of the tournament was announced on 30 October 2015.

The top two teams of each group advanced to the final stage. The teams were ranked according to points (3 points for a win, 1 point for a draw, 0 points for a loss). If tied on points, tiebreakers would be applied in the following order:
Goal difference in all games;
Goals scored in all games;
Head-to-head result in games between tied teams;
Drawing of lots.

All times were local, BRST (UTC−2).

Group A

Group B

Final stage
If teams finished level of points, the final order would be determined according to the same criteria as the first stage, taking into account only matches in the final stage.

This was the first time Venezuela reached the top four in the tournament.

Winners

Qualified teams for FIFA U-20 Women's World Cup
The following two teams from CONMEBOL qualified for the FIFA U-20 Women's World Cup.

1 Bold indicates champion for that year. Italic indicates host for that year.

Goalscorers
6 goals
 Yamila Rodríguez

4 goals
 Jennifer Westendorf

3 goals

 Micaela Cabrera
 Gabriela Nunes
 Paulina Lara
 Angie Ponce
 Jessica Martínez
 Yamila Badell
 Gabriela García

2 goals

 Geyse Ferreira
 Kélen Bender
 Katya Ponce
 Juliana Ocampo
 Valentina Restrepo
 Leicy Santos
 Mariela Jácome
 Alejandra Ramos
 Vimarest Díaz
 Yenifer Giménez
 Idalys Pérez

1 goal

 Lorena Benítez
 Juana Bilos
 Rocío Correa
 María Aguilar
 Marcela Ortiz
 Marjorie Castro
 Pamela Peñaloza
 Laura Rentería
 Maylin Arreaga
 Diana Ganan
 Kerlly Real
 Lice Chamorro
 Fanny Godoy
 Griselda López
 Amara Suafán
 Geraldine Cisneros
 Carmen Quesada
 Daiana Farías
 Ana Laura Millan
 Alexyar Cañas
 Tahicelis Marcano
 Kika Moreno
 Yosneidy Zambrano

Own goal

 Laurie Cristaldo (playing against Chile)
 Vannia Bravo (playing against Paraguay)

References

External links
Sudamericano Femenino Sub 20 Brasil 2015, CONMEBOL.com

2015
2015 in women's association football
2015
Under-20 Women's Football Championship
2015 in Brazilian football
2015 in youth association football